The Finnish national road 22 (also known as Kainuuntie, "Kainuu Road") is the main route between the major cities of Oulu and Kajaani in northern Finland. At the Oulu end, the road connects to Highway 4 (E8/E75), while at the Kajaani end, it connects to Highway 5 (E63).

The Finnish Transport Agency improved the entrance section of Highway 22 in Oulu between Joutsentie and Konttisentie, with the aim of increasing traffic flow and safety. In this contract, the section of Highway 22 between Joutsentie and Haarankangas was widened into a four-lane median road and the section between Haarankangas and Sääskensuontie was improved to a two-lane median road. From the direction of Kajaani, the lane arrangements of Highways 5 and Highway 6, i.e. the Sotkamontie multi-level interchange, were improved. In addition, two bypasses were built on Highway 5 at Häikiönmäentie and Pöyhölänniementie. Construction started at the end of 2015, but most of the contract work was carried out in 2016 and 2017. The total cost of the project was €16,200,000, of which the Finnish Transport Agency accounted for €15,000,000. Oulu, Muhos and Utajärvi contributed to the costs of the project with a total of €1,200,000.

Route 

The road passes through the following municipalities:
Oulu – Muhos – Utajärvi – Vaala – Paltamo – Kajaani

References

External links

Finnish national road 22 at Tiet – Mattigronroos.fi (in Finnish)

Roads in Finland
Transport in Oulu